Calothamnus quadrifidus subsp. asper is a plant in the myrtle family, Myrtaceae and is endemic to the south-west of Western Australia.  It is similar to other subspecies of Calothamnus quadrifidus except that its leaves are short, flat and obviously rough and scaly when mature.

Description
The leaves are also rough and scaly, with scattered hairs.

The flowers are a deep red colour and are arranged in clusters, usually on one side of the stem amongst the older leaves.

Taxonomy and naming
Calothamnus quadrifidus subsp. asper was first formally described in 2010 by Alex George in Nuytsia. It had originally been described in 1849 by Nikolai Turczaninow as Calothamnus asper. The word (asper) is a Latin word meaning "rough", "harsh" or "uneven".

Distribution and habitat
Calothamnus quadrifidus subsp. asper is found in the Wongan Hills district of the Avon Wheatbelt biogeographic region.

Conservation
Calothamnus quadrifidus subsp. asper is classified as "Priority Two" by the Western Australian Government Department of Parks and Wildlife meaning that it is poorly known and from fewer than five locations.

References

quadrifidus
Myrtales of Australia
Plants described in 2010
Plant subspecies